Ha llegado un extraño is a Mexican telenovela produced by Televisa and originally transmitted by Telesistema Mexicano.

Cast 
 Miguel Ángel Ferriz
 María Douglas
 Héctor Gómez
 Francisco Jambrina
 Alicia Montoya
 Silvia Caos
 Silvia Suárez
 Nicolás Rodríguez
 Pilar Souza
 Jorge Mateos
 Luis Gimeno
 José Antonio Cossío

References

External links 

Mexican telenovelas
Televisa telenovelas
1959 telenovelas
1959 Mexican television series debuts
1959 Mexican television series endings
Spanish-language telenovelas